Joanne Seymour (born 1965), is a female former swimmer who competed for England.

Swimming career
Seymour became National champion in 1982 when she won the 1982 ASA National Championship title in the 100 metres breaststroke.

Seymour represented England in the 100 metres breaststroke and 200 metres individual medley events, at the 1982 Commonwealth Games in Brisbane, Queensland, Australia.

References

1966 births
English female swimmers
Swimmers at the 1982 Commonwealth Games
Living people
Commonwealth Games competitors for England